is a retired Japanese volleyball player. She was a member of the Japanese winning teams, at the 1962 World Championships and 1964 Summer Olympics.

References

External links

 Video of 1964 Tokyo Olympics Women's Volleyball（the person who appears as Japanese left-handed server and spiker in this video）

1937 births
Living people
Olympic volleyball players of Japan
Volleyball players at the 1964 Summer Olympics
Olympic gold medalists for Japan
Japanese women's volleyball players
Olympic medalists in volleyball
Medalists at the 1964 Summer Olympics